Say It Again is the third album by American R&B singer Jermaine Stewart. It was released in 1988 on Arista Records; his second full-length album for the label, and his final album to be released in North America. The title track of the album reached No. 27 on the US Billboard Hot 100.

Background
Stewart told Record Mirror in 1988, "The album is definitely a progression. Vocally I've grown up and I was able to project a lot of the feeling and truth contained in the songs."

Track listing

Outtakes:
 "You Promise", B-side on the "Say It Again" single
 "Imagine", B-side on the "Get Lucky" single and later included on the compilation album Attention
 "Places", B-side on the "Don't Talk Dirty to Me" single and later included on Attention
 "Search", B-side on the "Is It Really Love" single and later included on Attention; also released as "Search for Love" on the B-side of the single "Hot & Cold"
 "Attention", included on the album Attention

Personnel
Musicians

 Jermaine Stewart – lead and backing vocals
 André Cymone – all instruments
 Jerry Knight – all instruments, backing vocals
 Aaron Zigman – all instruments
 Greg Porter – guitar solo on track 5
 Marty Walsh – guitar solo on track 8
 Jerry Hey – horn section on tracks 2 & 11
 Bill Reichenbach – horn section on tracks 2 & 11
 Kim Hutchcroft – horn section on tracks 2 & 11
 Larry Williams – sax solo on track 11
 Michael Lacata – drum fills on track 8
 Paulinho da Costa – percussion on track 10
 Marva King – backing vocals
 Muffy Hendrix – backing vocals
 Angel Rogers – backing vocals
 Jody Watley – backing vocals
 Wanda Hutchinson-Vaughn – backing vocals
 Pam Hutchinson – backing vocals
 James Ingram – backing vocals
 Josie James – backing vocals
 Deneice Williams – backing vocals
 Jackie James – backing vocals on tracks 3 & 9

Production
 Bobby Brooks – engineer
 Coke Johnson – engineer
 Ta Avi Mote – engineer
 Victor Flores – engineer
 Keith Cohen – engineer
 Mick Guzauski – engineer
 Gary Wagner – engineer
 Csaba Petocz – engineer
 Jared Held – assistant engineer
 Jimmy Preziosi – assistant engineer
 Jeff Lorenzen – assistant engineer
 Elmer Flores – assistant engineer
 John Arrias – additional engineer
 Jamie Yvette Snyder-Newman – production coordinator (André Cymone)
 Clive Davis – executive producer

Note
In the booklet, engineer "Jarod Held" is credited as "Jared Held", vocalist "Deniece Williams" as "Denise Williams" and vocalist "Wanda Vaughn" as "Wanda Hutchinson-Vaughn".

Charts

References

External links 
Jermaine Stewart's page on Artists With AIDS
Say It Again at Discogs

1988 albums
Jermaine Stewart albums
Arista Records albums
Albums produced by Jerry Knight
Albums produced by Aaron Zigman
Albums produced by André Cymone